The 14th Metro Manila Film Festival was held in 1988.

An unheralded and obscure movie, Patrolman was named the Best Picture in the 1988 Metro Manila Film Festival. The lead star, once unknown stuntman-actor Baldo Marro won the Best Actor award for his role as a dedicated policeman edging out the favored Christopher de Leon. Amy Austria won the Best Actress award for her convincing performance of a woman who led a life of crime in Bubbles: Ativan Gang. Other awardees include Best Director for Laurice Guillen, Best Supporting Actor for Dick Israel and Best Supporting Actress for Jacklyn Jose among others.

FPJ Productions' Agila ng Maynila was the festival's top grosser, with all six entries grossing ₱49.5 million in total.

Entries

Winners and nominees

Awards
Winners are listed first and highlighted in boldface.

Multiple awards

Ceremony information

"Best Director" controversy
During the award-giving ceremony, stuntman and character actor-turned-filmmaker Baldo Marro won the Best Actor for Patrolman film, which also won him the Best Director award. In fact, he was not known before this. He bested prizewinning director Chito Roño of Itanong Mo sa Buwan in the division, sending uproar from well-meaning critics and regular local film observers. Nevertheless, the announced Best Director award goes to Laurice Guillen.

References

External links

Metro Manila Film Festival
MMFF
MMFF